Bryan Cosgrave (23 March 1903 – 22 November 1992) was an Australian sportsman who played first-class cricket for Victoria and Australian rules football in the Victorian Football League (VFL) with Fitzroy.

In the 1924 VFL season, Cosgrave played five games and kicked four goals for Fitzroy. It was his only season and he turned his attention to cricket. He was a right-handed batsman top order batsman and made 178 from his four first-class matches, with 100 of them coming in an innings against Tasmania at Hobart in 1931–32.

His son James played cricket with Victoria briefly in the 1956–57 season.

See also
 List of Victoria first-class cricketers

References

External links

Cricinfo profile

1903 births
1992 deaths
Fitzroy Football Club players
Australian cricketers
Victoria cricketers
Cricketers from Melbourne
Australian rules footballers from Melbourne
People from Clifton Hill, Victoria